European Film Award for Best Animated Feature Film has been awarded annually since 2009 by the European Film Academy.

Winners and nominees

2009

2010s

2020s

Notes
 ± Oscar nominee
 ≠ Annie Award winner
 ° Annie Award nominee

Directors with multiple nominations
Tomm Moore - 3 (one win)
Ari Folman - 2 (one win)
Nora Twomey - 2

Most wins for Best Animated Feature by country

See also 
 Academy Award for Best Animated Feature
 BAFTA Award for Best Animated Film
 Goya Award for Best Animated Film
 Annie Award for Best Animated Feature — Independent
  Annie Award for Best Animated Feature
 Dallas–Fort Worth Film Critics Association Award for Best Animated Film

References

External links
 Nominees and winners at the European Film Academy website

Animated Feature
Awards for best animated feature film
Awards established in 2009
2009 establishments in Europe